Justine Elinor Frischmann (born 16 September 1969) is an English artist and retired musician. She was the lead singer of the Britpop band Elastica after forming Suede, before retiring from the music industry and pursuing a career as a painter.

Early years
Frischmann was born on 16 September 1969 in Kensington, London, the daughter of Wilem Frischmann, a Hungarian Holocaust survivor who is the former chairman of the Pell Frischmann company of consulting engineers, and a Russian mother. Her parents are both Jewish. She grew up in Twickenham, London, and attended St Paul's Girls School, before studying at the Bartlett School of Architecture at University College London.

Career

Music

Frischmann began writing and studying music at the age of eleven.

She was a founding member of the band Suede with Brett Anderson, whom she met at UCL in 1988. She left the band in October 1991. In the 2018 documentary "The Insatiable Ones", Anderson cites her as a huge influence on the band's first album.

Frischmann later founded and fronted her own band, Elastica. Their first album, Elastica, released in 1995, became the fastest selling debut album in UK history. They were signed to Deceptive Records in the UK, and later with Geffen Records in Europe and the US. In 1994, Elastica were voted Best New Band by NME readers at the Brit awards. In 1995, Elastica were nominated for the Mercury Music Prize for their album Elastica. The album went on to sell over a million copies worldwide. In 2001 the band announced an amicable breakup, citing, in part, burnout from a grueling touring schedule.

Frischmann spent the next few years developing artist M.I.A., whom she discovered. M.I.A. was Frischmann's friend and flatmate. Frischmann co-wrote and produced M.I.A.'s demos for her first album, Arular, most notably its 2003 single "Galang".

In 2017, Rough Trade Records released a remastered version of Elastica's first eponymously titled album. That year, there were rumours that Elastica had been asked to perform at M.I.A.'s Meltdown at the Southbank. In 2019, Rough Trade released a limited edition Elastica BBC sessions album on UK Record Store Day.

Television
In 2003, Frischmann co-presented a series called Dreamspaces for the BBC Television about modern architecture. In 2004, she presented The South Bank Show and was a judge for the RIBA Stirling Prize for Architecture.

Art
In 2005, Frischmann moved to Boulder, Colorado, to enroll in a masters program in visual arts at Naropa University, a small, Buddhist-inspired liberal arts college, and "become a nobody". In 2012 her work was shortlisted for the UK's Marmite Prize for painting, and she has been included in The Amsterdam List of 1000 Living Painters.

In a 2016 interview regarding her art career, Frischmann stated, "I don't really have any desire to make music, to be honest."

Frischmann has said, "The themes and ideas I am working with are in direct relation to an ongoing personal narrative; the big questions are reflected in the choices I make in my art ... [including] my ever-evolving relationship with my spiritual faith. I think my approach and aesthetics reveal internal struggles and speak to my family origins and history."

Personal life

Frischmann previously dated her Suede bandmate Brett Anderson. She then dated Blur lead singer Damon Albarn from 1991 until the couple broke up in 1998, which served as inspiration for Blur's 1999 singles "No Distance Left to Run" and "Tender". She is now married to a meteorologist, Professor Ian Faloona, and lives and works in the United States.

References

External links

Extensive interview with The Observer
Interview with The Independent
Indie Rock Chicks of the 90s

1969 births
Alumni of University College London
British expatriates in the United States
Elastica members
English women guitarists
English Jews
English rock guitarists
Women rock singers
Jewish British musicians
Living people
Musicians from London
Musicians from San Rafael, California
People from Twickenham
Suede (band) members
Britpop musicians
English people of Hungarian-Jewish descent
English people of Russian-Jewish descent
Jewish rock musicians
Guitarists from California
20th-century American guitarists
21st-century English women singers
21st-century English singers
20th-century English women musicians
20th-century American women guitarists
21st-century American women
Jewish punk rock musicians